The 1950 Denver Pioneers football team was an American football team that represented the University of Denver as a member of the Skyline Conference during the 1950 college football season. In its third season under head coach Johnny Baker, the team compiled a 3–8–1 record (2–2–1 against conference opponents), finished third in the conference, lost to Hawaii in the Pineapple Bowl, and outscored all opponents by a total of 265 to 260.

Schedule

References

Denver
Denver Pioneers football seasons
Denver Pioneers football